Martin Larsen (born 19 February 1992) is a Danish handball player for Aalborg Håndbold and the Danish national team.

References

1992 births
Living people
Sportspeople from Aalborg
Danish male handball players